CGTN French (formerly CCTV International French or CCTV-Français formerly CCTV-F is a French language entertainment and news channel of China Central Television (CCTV) originating in China, and are part of the Chinese Government's information ministry.

The channels cater to an international audience, with programmes containing French subtitles. There are also news programmes featuring French-language reporters. These programmes provide both Chinese and international news coverage.

Most programmes on CCTV-F are 30 minutes long. They feature a variety of content, including news programmes, educational programmes, and Chinese soap operas.

There are also programmes offering tourism advice and showcasing new Chinese artists.

CCTV-F launched on October 1, 2007, as the result of the splitting of CCTV E&F, a bi-lingual channel in both Spanish and French, three years after its launch on October 1, 2004.

On 1 January 2022 at midnight stroke or 00:00:00 Beijing Time marked New Year's Day, CGTN French officially showcasing and focusing on news, business, metropolitan, information and current affairs programmes and after all Mainland China television series programmes with Mandarin Chinese audio dubbed and French subtitles finally officially reaired, moving aired and integrated to CCTV-8.

On 31 January 2022, CGTN French along with all channel was live telecast on CMG Spring Festival Gala 2022.

External links 

 

F
French-language television stations
Television channels and stations established in 2007
2007 establishments in China